Gregor Bornemann is a German sailor, who as bowman, together with his teammates Roman Koch and Maxl Koch, became twice World Champion in the Soling.

Sailing life 
Bornemann as bowman won his first Soling World Championship 20–27 May 2005 of the Tyrrhenian sea in front of Castiglione della Pescaia, Italy with Roman and Maxl Koch. The second time took place five years later 5–13 February on the Guaiba river off the coast of Porto Alegre, Brasil. After the Championship in Castellione the "Koch" team earned the nickname "The Maremma boys". In 2009 the "Koch" team took the silver at the Soling Worlds in Etobicoke, Canada.
Furthermore, Bornemann won two gold and five silver medals at Soling European Championships between 2003 and 2013 all as bowman and with the same team members. Bornemann holds many national Championships in several countries.

Gregor became “Sailor of the Year 2010” in the Yacht-Club-Berlin-Grünau

Personal life 
Bornemann lives in Munich and works in the brewing and beverage industry.

References

Living people

Year of birth missing (living people)
German male sailors (sport)
Dragon class sailors
Sportspeople from Munich
Soling class world champions
European Champions Soling